Renga may refer to:

 Renga, a genre of Japanese collaborative poetry
 Francesco Renga, Italian singer-songwriter
 La Renga, hard rock Argentine band

See also 
 Rega (disambiguation)